Peerzada Ghulam Ahmad (August 1885 − 9 April 1952), known by his pen name as Mahjoor, was a poet of the Kashmir Valley, along with contemporaries, Zinda Kaul, Abdul Ahad Azad, and Dinanath Nadim. He is especially noted for introducing a new style into Kashmiri poetry and for expanding Kashmiri poetry into previously unexplored thematic realms.

Early life 
Mahjoor was born in the village of Mitrigam, Pulwama, 38 km from Srinagar and 5 km from Pulwama. He got his pen name Mahjoor when he visited Punjab and started writing poetry under the influence of great Urdu poet, Shibli Namani. He followed in the academic footsteps of his father, who was a scholar of Persian language. 
He received the primary education from the Maktab of Aashiq Trali (a renowned poet) in Tral. After passing the middle school examination from Nusrat-ul-Islam School, Srinagar, he went to Punjab where he came in contact with Urdu poets like Bismil Amritsari and Moulana Shibi Nomani. He returned to Srinagar in 1908 and started writing in Persian and then in Urdu.
Determined to write in his native language, Mahjoor used the simple diction of traditional folk storytellers in his writing. 

Mahjoor worked as a patwari (regional administrator) in Kashmir. Along with his official duties, he spent his free time writing poetry, and his first Kashmiri poem 'Vanta hay vesy' was published in 1918.

Poetic legacy

Mahjoor is recognized by one commentator as a poet who revolutionized the traditional forms of nazm and ghazal.

In 1972, a bilingual film named Shayar-e-Kashmir Mahjoor was released with the Hindi version starring Balraj Sahni. A square in Srinagar is named after him. He is buried near the poet Habba Khatoon at a site near Athwajan on the Jammu-Srinagar national highway.

A song featured in Coke Studio Explorer, "Ha Gulo" is written by Mahjoor and was sung by Kashmiri regional band Qasamir.

Bibliography
 Ghulam Ahmad Mahjoor. Poems of Mahjoor.  New Delhi: Sahitya Academi, 1988.
 Ghulam Ahmad Mahjoor. The Best of Mahjoor: Selections from Mahjoor's Kashmiri Poems (translated by Triloki Nath Raina).  Srinagar, India: J&K Academy of Art, Culture and Languages, 1989.

References

Kashmiri poets
1887 births
1952 deaths
20th-century Indian poets
Kashmiri people
Indian male poets
Poets from Jammu and Kashmir
20th-century Indian male writers